Johan Brunström and Nicholas Monroe were the defending champions but chose not to defend their title.

Stefan Kozlov and John-Patrick Smith won the title after defeating Sekou Bangoura and David O'Hare 6–3, 6–3 in the final.

Seeds

Draw

References
 Main Draw

Nielsen Pro Tennis Championship - Doubles
2016 Doubles